Georgios Tsiaras (alternate spelling: Giorgos Tsiaras; born May 4, 1982) is a Greek former professional basketball player and the current team manager of Peristeri of the Greek Basket League and the Basketball Champions League. During his playing career, he mainly covered the power forward position, but he could also assist at the center position.

Professional career
During his first professional years, Tsiaras played with AEK Athens, and with them he won the Greek League championship in 2002. In 2006, he moved to his home city of Larissa, and to the local club Olympia Larissa. In 2008, he moved to PAOK Thessaloniki. In 2010, he joined the Czech League club CEZ Nymburk. At the end of the season, he came back to Greece, signing with Panionios. He later played with Ikaros Kallitheas and Aris Thessaloniki. For the 2013–14 season, he signed with the Romanian League club CS Gaz Metan Mediaş. In August 2014, he signed with the Spanish 2nd Division team Club Melilla Baloncesto. In May 2015, he returned to his former team Aris, for the Greek League 2014–15 season playoffs. On August 1, 2016, Tsiaras joined Apollon Patras, where he spent two seasons.

National team career
Tsiaras was a member of the Greek junior national teams, and with them he won the gold medal at the 2002 FIBA Europe Under-20 Championship.

Awards and accomplishments

Pro career
Greek League Champion: (2002)
Greek League All-Star: (2008)
Czech NBL champion (2010)
Czech Cup winner (2010)

Greek junior national team
2000 FIBA Europe Under-18 Championship: 
2000 Albert Schweitzer Tournament: 
2002 FIBA Europe Under-20 Championship:

References

External links
Euroleague.net Profile
FIBA.com Profile 
Eurobasket.com Profile
Greek Basket League Profile 

1982 births
Living people
AEK B.C. players
Apollon Patras B.C. players
Aries Trikala B.C. players
Aris B.C. players
Centers (basketball)
Basketball Nymburk players
Basketball players from Larissa
Greek basketball coaches
Greek Basket League players
Greek expatriate basketball people in Spain
Greek men's basketball players
Ikaros B.C. players
Kymis B.C. players
Melilla Baloncesto players
Olympia Larissa B.C. players
Panionios B.C. players
P.A.O.K. BC players
Power forwards (basketball)